Power-line flicker is a visible change in brightness of a lamp due to rapid fluctuations in the voltage of the power supply. The voltage drop is generated over the source impedance of the grid by the changing load current of an equipment or facility. These fluctuations in time generate flicker. The effects can range from disturbance to epileptic attacks of photosensitive persons. Flicker may also affect sensitive electronic equipment such as television receivers or industrial processes relying on constant electrical power.

Causes
Flicker may be produced, for example, if a steel mill uses large electric motors or arc furnaces on a distribution network, or frequent starting of an elevator motor in an office building, or if a rural residence has a large water pump starting regularly on a long feeder system. The likelihood of flicker increase as the size of the changing load becomes larger with respect to the prospective short-circuit current available at the point of common connection.

Measurement of flicker
The requirements of a flicker measurement equipment are defined in the international electro-technical standard IEC 61000-4-15.

A flicker meter is composed of several function blocks which simulate a 230 V/60 W incandescent lamp (reference lamp) and the human perception system (eye-brain model).

From the resulting momentary value of flicker the short term flicker "perceptibility" value Pst is calculated according to a statistical process over a standardized 10-minute observation interval. Long term flicker Plt is calculated as the cubic mean of several Pst values over a standardized two-hour period.

The perceptibility value calculation and scaling algorithm were chosen such that a P value of 1.0 corresponds to a level at which 50% of test subjects found the flicker to be both noticeable and irritating.

In the standard IEC 61000-3-3 the observation intervals and the limiting values for Pst and Plt are specified:

Operating condition of the EUT
The IEC-flicker standard states that the EUT (Equipment Under Test) has to be operated during the test in a way which is the worst case state with respect to flicker.
If the EUT is operated in a (relatively) constant fashion during the whole test, Plt = Pst will result. If this state is feasible and realistic this means Pst has to fulfill the limits for Plt (which are lower).

Estimation
A purely analytical calculation of Pst is almost impossible. In the standard there are formulas which allow the estimation of the Pst values to be expected.

Flicker mitigation
Flicker is generated by load changes. Only the amplitude of the load change is relevant, not the absolute value. A reduction in flicker can be attained through making less frequent load changes, or smaller load changes. If the load is changed gradually (for example, by the help of power electronics) instead of step fashion, this also makes flicker less perceptible.

The relationship between amplitude of load changes and Pst is linear, i.e. halving the switched load results in half the Pst. The relationship between number of load changes per time (n/ Tp) and Pst is non-linear. A halving of load changes reduces Pst by only about 20%. In order to have half the Pst, the number of load changes must be reduced by a factor of 9.

See also
Power quality

References

External links
 FlickerSim open source flicker measurement simulator

Electric power distribution
Electromagnetic compatibility
Electronics concepts